The Central African Republic is one of 29 countries where Scouting exists (be it embryonic or widespread) but where there is no National Scout Organization which is a member of the World Organization of the Scout Movement at the present time. Scouting was founded in French Equatorial Africa in 1941, and was first recognized in 1969. The Fédération du scoutisme centrafricain, or FESCA, is the national federation of seven Scouting organizations. While FESCA was still recognized in 1990, there were 7,000 Scouts, and total membership at the end of 1998 was reported as being the same number.

The Federation was suspended from WOSM membership in 1999 due to non-payment of membership fees.

Members
Among the members of the federation are
 the Association des scouts catholiques centrafricains (Association of Catholic Central African Scouts), founded in 1961, coeducational
 the Eclaireuses et Eclaireurs Centrafricains (Central African Scouts and Guides), interreligious, coeducational
 the Eclaireurs et Eclaireuses Unionistes Centrafricains (Central African Protestant Scouts and Guides), coeducational

Program and ideals

 Louveteaux (Cub Scouts) - ages 6 to 11
 Scouts — ages 12 to 17
 Routiers (Rover Scouts) - ages 17 and up

The Scout Motto is Toujours Prêt, Always Prepared in French.

The Scout emblem incorporates the color scheme of the flag of the Central African Republic, superimposed on a map of the country.

See also
 Association Nationale des Guides de Centrafrique

Non-aligned Scouting organizations
Scouting and Guiding in the Central African Republic
Youth organizations established in 1941